Robert Victor Jackson (born 24 September 1946) is a British politician. He was a Member of the European Parliament (MEP) from 1979 to 1984 and Member of Parliament (MP) for Wantage from 1983 to 2005, having been elected as a Conservative; however, he joined the Labour Party in 2005.

Early life
He was raised in Nkana, Northern Rhodesia (now Zambia) where his father worked on the copper mines and was educated at Falcon College in Rhodesia and St Edmund Hall, Oxford, where he rose to the presidency of the Oxford Union. He was then elected to a fellowship of All Souls College, Oxford, one of the UK's most prestigious academic distinctions. Jackson is married to Caroline Jackson, a former Member of the European Parliament. He had worked as a political advisor to senior ministers prior to being elected and also as political advisor to the Governor of Rhodesia, Lord Soames, during its transition to independence as Zimbabwe. He edited the Round Table Journal from 1970 to 1974.

Parliamentary career
In the October 1974 general election, Jackson stood in Manchester Central without success. In European Parliament election in 1979 he was elected as a Member of the European Parliament (MEP) for Upper Thames. He played a prominent role on the European Parliament's budget committee. At the 1983 general election, he was elected to the House of Commons as MP for Wantage. He was subsequently appointed as a junior minister at the Department of Education and Science (1987–90), the Department of Employment (1990–92) and the Office of Public Service and Science (1992–93).

Resignation
On 15 January 2005, he defected to the Labour Party, stating that the Tories under Michael Howard had "incoherent" policies on public services, "dangerous" views on Europe, and had "wobbled" on the issue of Iraq. He had been on the liberal and pro-European wing of the Conservatives, one of the few of that Party's MPs who supported the reduction in the age of consent for gay men. He has been treasurer of the Conservative Mainstream association and supported Kenneth Clarke in the 2001 Leadership election.

Before defecting, Jackson had indicated he would not stand in the forthcoming general election, following Iain Duncan Smith's election as Conservative Leader, and he duly stepped down in April 2005. In the 2005 general election, he was succeeded by Ed Vaizey, a prominent conservative columnist and pundit, the candidate selected by the local Conservative Association.

Works

References

1946 births
Living people
Labour Party (UK) MPs for English constituencies
Conservative Party (UK) MPs for English constituencies
Editors of the Round Table Journal
Presidents of the Oxford Union
Fellows of All Souls College, Oxford
Alumni of St Edmund Hall, Oxford
UK MPs 1983–1987
UK MPs 1987–1992
UK MPs 1992–1997
UK MPs 1997–2001
UK MPs 2001–2005
Conservative Party (UK) MEPs
MEPs for England 1979–1984
Alumni of Falcon College